Acacia linifolia, known colloquially as white wattle, or flax wattle, is a species of Acacia native to eastern Australia.

Description
Like most species of Acacia it has phyllodes rather than true leaves. The inflorescences occur in groups of 5 to 17 in an axillary raceme and have spherical flower-heads with a diameter of  containing 6 to 12 pale yellow to white coloured flowers. The glabrous, thinly leathery seed pods that form after flowering are often covered in a fine white powdery coating and are straight or curved and more or less flat but are raised over the seeds.

Taxonomy
Acacia linifolia was first described in 1800 by Étienne Pierre Ventenat as Mimosa linifolia. In 1806 Carl Ludwig Willdenow redescribed it as belonging to the genus, Acacia, and it became Acacia linifolia. The specific epithet is in reference to the shape of the phyllodes that are similar to the leaves of flax plants. The species is quite similar in appearance to Acacia boormanii and Acacia meiantha.

Distribution
It is found in New South Wales and has a range that extends from around the Hunter Valley in the north down to around the Hill Top area and is quite common around Sydney. It is usually found as a part of dry sclerophyll forest or heathland or open, woodland communities growing in skeletal sandy soils over or around sandstone or in clay soils over or around shale.

See also
List of Acacia species

References

linifolia
Fabales of Australia
Flora of New South Wales
Plants described in 1800
Taxa named by Carl Ludwig Willdenow